The Cancer Institute NSW Premier’s Awards for Outstanding Cancer Research are the premier awards ceremony for the cancer research sector in NSW. Now in its tenth year, the event honours the achievements of the individuals and teams that work across the cancer research sector to lessen the impact of cancer for the people of NSW.

These awards are an opportunity to honour the state’s outstanding cancer researchers whose brilliant minds together with their commitment to years and even decades of focused work have led to new discoveries about cancer diagnoses, treatments and survival. Their achievements reflect that improving cancer outcomes is a series of incremental steps.

As the NSW Government’s cancer control agency, the Cancer Institute NSW supports, facilitates and collaborates with all in the cancer control sector to translate new discoveries in to meaningful knowledge to improve the health system of NSW. This new information is providing the evidence we need to drive rapid improvement in cancer prevention, treatment, care and ultimately, survival outcomes.

Past award nights

2011 Cancer Research Awards

2012 Cancer Research Awards

2013 Cancer Research Awards

2014 Cancer Research Awards

2015 Cancer Research Awards

2016 NSW Premier's Awards for Outstanding Cancer Research
   Outstanding Cancer Researcher of the Year – Professor John Simes
   The Professor Rob Sutherland AO Make a Difference Award – Professor Minoti Apte 
   Outstanding Cancer Research Fellow – Dr Zaklina Kovacevic
   The ‘Rising Star’ PhD Student Award  – Dr Andrew Chen
   Big Data, Big Impact – Associate Professor Daniel Catchpoole and Team, Sydney Children’s Hospital Network
   Excellence in Translation Cancer Research – Dr Natalie Taylor and Team, Australian Institute of Health Innovation Behaviour Change Research Stream
   The ‘Wildfire’ Highly Cited Publication Award – Dr James Wilmott
   Innovation in Cancer Clinical Trials – Central Coast Local Health District

2017 NSW Premier's Awards for Outstanding Cancer Research
   Outstanding Cancer Researcher of the Year – Professor Richard Kefford 
   The Professor Rob Sutherland AO Make a Difference Award – Professor David Goldstein
   Outstanding Cancer Research Fellow – Dr Marina Pajic
   The ‘Rising Star’ PhD Student Award  – Rebecca Poulos
   Big Data, Big Impact – no award
   Excellence in Translational Cancer Research – Professor Richard Scolyer and Professor Georgina Long, Melanoma Institute Australia
   The ‘Wildfire’ Highly Cited Publication Award – Professor Helen Rizos, Melanoma Translational Research Team
   Outstanding Cancer Clinical Trials Unit Award – Central West Cancer Care Centre

See also
 Cancer Institute NSW
 List of medicine awards

Notes

External links 
Cancer Institute NSW

Medicine awards
Australian science and technology awards